Benjamin Yeboah Sekyere is a Ghanaian politician and member of the Seventh Parliament and the 8th Parliament of the Fourth Republic of Ghana, representing the Tano South Constituency in the Ahafo region on the ticket of the New Patriotic Party. He is the deputy Minister of the newly created Ahafo region.

Early life and education 
Sekyere was born on Friday, 4 March 1977 in  Derma of  the Ahafo region. He obtained a bachelor's degree in Business Administration from the University of Ghana, prior to that, he had gain a HND Accounting from the Sunyani Polytechnic. He also holds a MBA. Accounting/Finance from the University of Professional Studies.

Professional and political career 
He was an Accountant in the Ghana Education Service. Before joining active politics, he was the principal Accountant in the Berekum Municipal Officer of the Ghana Education Service. He was re-elected in the 2020 General election to represent in the 8th Parliament of the Fourth Republic of Ghana. He won the parliamentary seat with 22,034 votes whiles Hanna Bissiw had 19,731 votes. He was the Deputy Minister for the Ahafo region in 2020.

Personal life 
He is married with three children. He is a  Seventh-Day Adventist.

Committees 
He is part of the Works and Housing Committee and also the Poverty Reduction Strategy Committee. He is currently the ranking member for the Poverty Reduction Strategy Committee, also a member of Lands and Forestry Committee and also Local Government and Rural Development Committee.

Philanthropy 
In 2018, he donated a school bus to the Samuel Otu Senior High School. He also gave 20 laptops to some SHS and about 871 uniforms to some schools in Tano South.

References

Ghanaian MPs 2017–2021
1977 births
Living people
New Patriotic Party politicians
University of Professional Studies alumni
Ghanaian MPs 2021–2025
University of Ghana alumni
Sunyani Technical University alumni